Itewe is an administrative ward in the Chunya District of the Mbeya Region of Tanzania. In 2016 the Tanzania National Bureau of Statistics report there were 6,465 people in the ward, from 8,341 in 2012.

Villages / vitongoji 
The ward has 5 villages and 21 vitongoji.

 Itewe
 Barabarani
 Igalako
 Ikulu
 Maendeleo
 Msimbazi
 Mtaa No. 8
 Mwambalizi
 Sawa
 Tembela
 Tembela A
 Tembela B
 Iyelanyala
 Jericho
 Lutundu
 Idunda
 Mapinduzi A
 Mapinduzi B
 Mapinduzi C
 Mapinduzi D
 Isongwa
 Isongwa A
 Isongwa B
 Isongwa C
 Isongwa D
 Isongwa E

References 

Wards of Mbeya Region